The European School of Costa Rica is a K-12 International Baccalaureate school located in San Pablo de Heredia, Costa Rica with enrollment of approximately 500.  It was founded in 1989.

Languages
Instruction is in English, Spanish and French.  Sixty percent of the students are Costa Rican.  Assistance is provided in Spanish and French.  Teachers originate from over a dozen countries.

Academics
The curriculum is created by director Anne Aronson.  Class size is capped at 20.  Enrollees attend lunch with their teachers.bbStudent conduct and responsibility is a focal point of the daily curriculum, in addition to mandatory annual class trips within Costa Rica.

Facilities
The school has soccer fields, basketball courts, a gymnasium, and string music program.

Events
This school has many special events in its calendar: Wearable Arts, School Picnic, I.B. Art exhibit, Trash Picking, Valentines Day, Halloween, State Fair. These are all celebrations on a specific date where students partake in several activities.

References

Schools in Costa Rica
1989 establishments in North America
Educational institutions established in 1989